Pirillo is a surname. Notable people with the surname include:

 Chris Pirillo (born 1973), founder and maintainer of Lockergnome
 Dan Pirillo (born 1985), baseball player and coach
 Sylvio Pirillo (1916–1991), Brazilian football striker

See also
 Perillo, surname

Italian-language surnames